Charles Lucien Treffel (23 June 1875 – 18 October 1947) was a French water polo player. He competed in the men's tournament at the 1900 Summer Olympics.

See also
 List of Olympic medalists in water polo (men)

References

External links
 

1875 births
1947 deaths
French male water polo players
Olympic water polo players of France
Water polo players at the 1900 Summer Olympics
Sportspeople from Lille